Bohumil Cepák (13 July 1951 – 4 September 2021) was a Czech handball player who competed for Czechoslovakia in the 1976 Summer Olympics.

In 1976 he was part of the Czechoslovak team which finished seventh in the Olympic tournament. He played all five matches.

References

External links
 profile

1951 births
2021 deaths
People from Sezimovo Ústí
Czechoslovak male handball players
Czech male handball players
Olympic handball players of Czechoslovakia
Handball players at the 1976 Summer Olympics
Sportspeople from the South Bohemian Region